Maynard Menefee (October 15, 1907 – March 8, 1993) was an American politician who served in the Iowa House of Representatives from 1969 to 1973.

He died on March 8, 1993, in Walnut Creek, California at age 85.

References

1907 births
1993 deaths
Republican Party members of the Iowa House of Representatives
20th-century American politicians